Aleksandr Anatolyevich Yevgenyev, Aleksandr Yevgenyev; born July 20, 1961, is a former Soviet 200 metre sprinter. His achievements include:
 Soviet Union 200 metre champion (1985 and 1986)
 National indoor 200 metres champion (1984 and 1986)
 Member of the team that won the sprint relay at the European Cup (1985)
 European indoor champion in the 200 m (1983 and 1984) and placing in 1985 and 1986.

References

External links 
 

1961 births
Soviet male sprinters
Living people
World Athletics Championships medalists
European Athletics Championships medalists
Goodwill Games medalists in athletics
World Athletics Indoor Championships winners
Competitors at the 1986 Goodwill Games
Friendship Games medalists in athletics
Herzen University alumni